Pablo Justiniani (born 9 March 1952) is a Panamanian weightlifter. He competed in the men's light heavyweight event at the 1976 Summer Olympics.

References

1952 births
Living people
Panamanian male weightlifters
Olympic weightlifters of Panama
Weightlifters at the 1976 Summer Olympics
Place of birth missing (living people)
Pan American Games medalists in weightlifting
Pan American Games bronze medalists for Panama
Weightlifters at the 1975 Pan American Games
20th-century Panamanian people
21st-century Panamanian people